The Men's team time trial of the 2013 UCI Road World Championships cycling event took place on 22 September 2013 in the region of Tuscany, Italy.

Final classification

References

External links

Men's team time trial
2013 UCI World Tour
UCI Road World Championships – Men's team time trial
2013 in men's road cycling